Rider Spoke developed by Blast Theory in collaboration with the Mixed Reality Lab was first staged at the Barbican, London in October 2007. Created for cyclists, it combines elements of theatre, performance, game play and state of the art technology. Rider Spoke was built in the IPerG project on the EQUIP architecture.

Rider Spoke has since been presented in Athens (2008), Brighton (2008), Budapest (2008), Sydney (2009, Adelaide (2009) and Liverpool (2010).

References 

Icon Issue 054, December 2007, p. 97.
The Guardian, 03.10.2007, pp. 28–29.
Metro, 15.10.2007 
Metro, 09.10.2007

Academic References 

Chamberlain, A and Benford, S. Eds, "Deliverable D17.3 A Cultural Console Game, Final Report", Rider Spoke, IperG (Integrated Project on Pervasive Gaming) 2008.

In Leonardo (journal), the journal for The International Society for the Arts, Sciences and Technology (Leonardo/ISAST) - Issue 43:1 2009.

Rowland, D., Flintham, M., Oppermann, L.,  Marshall, J., Chamberlain, A., Koleva, B., Benford, S & Perez, C. 'Ubikequitous Computing: Designing Interactive Experiences for Cyclists'.  Mobile HCI 09. 15-18 September 2009, Bonn, Germany.

Oppermann, L., Flintham, M., Reeves, S., Benford, S., Greenhalgh, C., Marshall, J., Adams, M., Row Far, J. & Tandavanitj, N. 'Lessons from touring a location-based experience'. Pervasive 11. 12-15 June 2011, San Francisco, USA.

Chamberlain, A. 'Being: Physical - People, Performance, Art and Space'. HCI 09 (BCS-SIGCHI). ws, The Body in Communication, 1–5 September 2009, Cambridge, UK.

External links 
Blast Theory
Mixed Reality Lab
Riders Have Spoken
British Council documentary by Jess Scully and Jonathon Rogers

Pervasive games
Digital media
Computer art
Postmodern art
Contemporary works of art
British artist groups and collectives
Digital artworks